Südalinn (Estonian for Downtown, literally "Heart Town") is a subdistrict in the district of Kesklinn (Midtown), Tallinn, the capital of Estonia. It has a population of 169.

References

Subdistricts of Tallinn
Kesklinn, Tallinn